Regional Cancer Centre may mean:
 Regional Cancer Centre, India
 Regional Cancer Centre, Allahabad
 Regional Cancer Centre, JIPMER, Pondicherry
 Regional Cancer Center, Raipur
 Regional Cancer Centre, Shimla
 Regional Cancer Centre, Thiruvananthapuram
 RST Regional Cancer Centre, Nagpur.